The deputy premier of Ontario is a minister of the Crown and senior member of the provincial Executive Council (Cabinet). The office was first created in 1977 is conferred on the advice of the premier of Ontario.

Sylvia Jones is the 12th and current deputy premier of Ontario, assuming office on June 24, 2022. She concurrently serves as the minister of health.

History

For much of the province's early history, the position of provincial secretary and registrar of Ontario was the second most powerful position in the Ontario Cabinet. This role diminished by the 1960s, overtaken by the deputy premier in 1977 and abolished in 1985.

To date, every person serving as deputy premier of Ontario has also concurrently held another senior position in the Ontario Cabinet. Bette Stephenson, Robert Nixon, Floyd Laughren, Ernie Eves, Jim Flaherty, and Dwight Duncan were all concurrently provincial treasurer or, as that position was renamed in 1993, minister of Finance.

Deputy premiers of Ontario

See also
Deputy premier (Canada)
 List of Ontario premiers
 Politics of Ontario
 Premier (Canada)

References